Lasn is an Estonian surname. Notable people with the surname include:

Juhan Lasn (1861–1930), Estonian politician
Kalle Lasn (born 1942), Estonian-Canadian film maker, author, magazine editor, and activist

Estonian-language surnames